Port of Lost Dreams is a 1934 American drama film directed by Frank R. Strayer and starring William Boyd, Lola Lane and George F. Marion.

Cast
 William Boyd as Lars Christensen  
 Lola Lane as Molly Deshon / Molly Clark Christensen  
 George F. Marion as Capt. Morgan Rock 
 Edward Gargan as Porky the Freda's 'Crew'  
 Harold Huber as Louis Constolos  
 Robert Elliott as Lt. Andersen  
 Evelyn Carter Carrington as Mother McGee, Bar Owner  
 Charles C. Wilson as Warden  
 Robert Frazer as Radio Announcer  
 Lafe McKee as Justice of the Peace 
 Lew Kelly as First Hospital Detective  
 Eddie Phillips as Constolos' Lawyer

References

Bibliography
 Michael R. Pitts. Poverty Row Studios, 1929–1940: An Illustrated History of 55 Independent Film Companies, with a Filmography for Each. McFarland & Company, 2005.

External links
 

1934 films
1934 drama films
American drama films
Films directed by Frank R. Strayer
Chesterfield Pictures films
American black-and-white films
1930s English-language films
1930s American films